Maurice Blitz (28 July 1891 – 2 February 1975) was a Belgian Olympic water polo player during the 1920s. He was born in Paris. He was the older brother of sporting champion Gérard Blitz, and father of Gérard Blitz who founded Club Med in 1950.

Maurice Blitz and his brother Gérard were both member of the Belgian water polo national team who won silver in two consecutive olympic events, in 1920 and 1924.

Maurice Blitz, who was Jewish, did not leave the water polo scene once he retired from competitions. He became an international referee (he conducted the Olympic final in 1928), and was a member of the Belgian Olympic Committee and swimming federation.

In 1948, he founded the swimming and waterpolo club Zwemclub Scaldis in Antwerp.

He was one of the early financial supporters of Club Med, founded by his son Gérard in 1950.

See also
 List of Olympic medalists in water polo (men)
 List of select Jewish water polo players

References

External links
 
 Jews in Sports

1891 births
1975 deaths
Belgian male water polo players
Water polo players at the 1920 Summer Olympics
Water polo players at the 1924 Summer Olympics
Olympic water polo players of Belgium
Olympic silver medalists for Belgium
Jewish water polo players
Belgian Jews
Jewish Belgian sportspeople
Olympic medalists in water polo
Medalists at the 1924 Summer Olympics
Medalists at the 1920 Summer Olympics
Water polo players from Paris
20th-century Belgian people